Richard III (died 10 June 1120) was count of Aversa and prince of Capua briefly in 1120 between his anointing on 27 May and his death; he was the only son and heir of Robert I of Capua.  He was an infant when his father died, and he fell under the regency of his uncle, Jordan.  Richard III died within a few months and, though no contemporary chronicler blames him, some modern historians have cast doubt on Jordan's innocence.  Jordan did succeed unopposed to the diminished Capuan throne.

1120 deaths
Italo-Normans
Counts of Aversa
Princes of Capua
Year of birth unknown